"D'amour ou d'amitié" (meaning "Of Love or Friendship") is a song by Canadian singer Celine Dion, recorded for her French-language album, Tellement j'ai d'amour... (1982). It was written by lyricist Eddy Marnay and French composers Jean Pierre Lang and Roland Vincent. "D'amour ou d'amitié" was released as a single in France in December 1982 and in Quebec, Canada in April 1983. The song became a commercial success, topping the chart in Quebec and reaching top ten in France. It was also certified Gold in both countries, making Dion the first Canadian artist to receive a Gold certification in France. In 2005, "D'amour ou d'amitié" was included on Dion's greatest hits album, On ne change pas.

Background and release
In 1982, Eddy Marnay discovered a melody written by Jean Pierre Lang and Roland Vincent and wrote lyrics for it, creating "D'amour ou d'amitié". He wrote about awakening to love and crossing the barrier from friendship to romance. The song was recorded at the Family Sound Studio in Paris in July 1982 and produced by Marnay, assisted by Rudi Pascal. Pathé-Marconi released it as a 7" single in France in December 1982, with "Visa pour les beaux jours" on the B-side.

In January 1983, Dion represented Canada as revelation of the year at Midem in Cannes. She performed "D'amour ou d'amitié" in front of 3,500 music professionals. After that, RTL radio station decided to make "D'amour ou d'amitié" their favorite song and played it several times a day. Soon, other radio stations in France followed suit. Few days later, Dion performed "D'amour ou d'amitié" on Michel Drucker's popular TV show, Champs-Élysées. In April 1983, Pathé-Marconi also released "D'amour ou d'amitié" as a 12" maxi-single with two more songs. The same month, a 7" single was issued in Quebec, Canada by Saisons. It was the second single from Tellement j'ai d'amour..., after "Tellement j'ai d'amour pour toi". In early 1984 in Germany, Dion also released a German-language version of "D'amour ou d'amitié" titled "Was bedeute ich dir". The B-side included "Mon ami, geh nicht fort", a German version of "Mon ami m'a quittée".

Commercial performance
"D'amour ou d'amitié" became Dion's first commercially successful single. In France, it reached number five on the chart in the summer of 1983 and was certified Gold on 1 September 1983 for selling 500,000 units. By the end of 1983, the single has sold over 700,000 copies in France. Dion also became the first Canadian artist to receive a Gold certification in France. Following this success, she released her first album in France in September 1983, Du soleil au cœur, which featured songs taken from Dion's two albums previously issued in Quebec, Canada.

The song also became a hit in Quebec, where it entered the chart on 7 May 1983 and topped it for four consecutive weeks in July and August 1983. It spent forty weeks on the chart in total and was certified Gold in April 1985 for selling over 50,000 copies in Canada.

Accolades
Thanks to "D'amour ou d'amitié", Dion won the Félix Award for Artist of the Year Achieving the Most Success Outside Quebec.

Track listings and formats

Canadian 7" single
"D'amour ou d'amitié" – 3:59
"Le vieux monsieur de la rue Royale" – 4:10

French 7" single
"D'amour ou d'amitié" – 3:55
"Visa pour les beaux jours" – 3:22

French 12" maxi-single
"D'amour ou d'amitié" – 3:55
"Visa pour les beaux jours" – 3:22
"Ce n'était qu'un rêve" – 3:47
"L'amour viendra" – 4:20

German 7" single
"Was bedeute ich dir" – 3:55
"Mon ami, geh nicht fort" – 2:58

Charts

Weekly charts

Decade-end charts

Certifications and sales

Release history

References

1982 singles
1982 songs
Celine Dion songs
Corneille (singer) songs
French-language songs
Song recordings produced by Eddy Marnay
Songs written by Eddy Marnay